Susan Gabrielle Ball (born March 2, 1967, in Philadelphia, Pennsylvania) is an American actress and vegetarian. She stopped acting in her early twenties, and now dabbles in photography. She is best known for her starring role in Leo & Liz in Beverly Hills, which was created by Steve Martin.  She has had many guest starring and recurring roles, most notably on Rags to Riches, Perfect Strangers, Valerie, and It's a Living.

Early life
Ball was born in Philadelphia, Pennsylvania. As a teen, she was selected to participate as an actress in the Sundance Institute's prestigious Director's Workshop.

Filmography

Television

Films

References

External links

Living people
American stand-up comedians
American television actresses
1967 births
Actresses from Philadelphia
University of Vermont alumni
21st-century American comedians
21st-century American actresses